Pico do Monte Negro is the highest mountain in the Brazilian state of Rio Grande do Sul, at .

It is located in the canyon of same name, more precisely at the city of São José dos Ausentes. The peak is considered easy to reach. By car, it is possible to reach the base of the mountain, with the rest of the way being travelled by foot.

All the mountain and its surroundings are covered by a dense Araucaria forest.

References 

Mountains of Brazil
Highest points of Brazilian states